George Nasmith Luxton (August 13, 1901 – October 2, 1970) was the Anglican bishop of Huron in Canada in the mid-20th century.

Educated at the University of Toronto, he was ordained in 1925. He was a curate at  Christ's Church Cathedral, Hamilton then rector at  Christ Church, Calgary. After further incumbencies at St Catharines, Ontario and Grace Church on-the-Hill, Toronto he became Dean of Huron in 1943 and its bishop in 1948.

Notes

 

1901 births
University of Toronto alumni
Anglican bishops of Huron
20th-century Anglican Church of Canada bishops
1970 deaths